Jorge Andrés Giménez Ochoa (Caracas; August 11, 1987) is a businessman linked to chavismo and a Venezuelan soccer manager. Since 2016, he is president of Deportivo Lara and since 2021, president of  Federación Venezolana de Fútbol (FVF).

Education 
He studied business administration at the Universidad Nueva Esparta (El Hatillo, Miranda). He defines himself as dedicated "to the business world in the hands of family companies".

President of the FVF 
Giménez ran for the 2021 elections for the presidency of the FVF on the same board as Pedro Infante, former vice minister of sport of the government and former director of the FVF whose presence was one of the factors that triggered the intervention of FIFA on the body in 2020, as it is forbidden by this entity for a government to have an inherence over a national federation. The other element was the death of the manager Jesús Berardinelli, after being moved to a clinic because of respiratory insufficiency, after being arrested for corruption accusations.

The Giménez and Infante candidacy obtained 57 of the 92 votes that were cast in the elections of 2021-05-28, resulting winners, after months of unstability after complaints of corruption. He took office for the 2021–2025 term on the following June 7.

Controversies 

Giménez Ochoa is accused of managing influences in the Bolipuertos operator and of a commercial relationship with the businessman Raúl Gorrín and the vice president of Venezuela, Delcy Rodriguez. He traveled on the private flight that landed at the Barajas Airport (Madrid, Spain) on January 20, 2020, with the vice president of the country and which its occupants were prohibited from entering the country in a scandal that later became known as Delcygate. He was also part of the delegation of the vice president who visited Qatar in June 2021, on his first trip as president of the FVF and while the vinotinto was in Brazil playing the Copa América 2021 amid the controversy over the contagion of COVID-19 of 13 team members.

He was also part of the delegation of the vice president who visited Qatar in June 2021, on his first trip as president of the FVF and while the Venezuela national football time was in Brazil playing the Copa América 2021 amid the controversy over the contagion of COVID-19 of 13 team members.

In 2020, he was accused of being involved in the death of Edward Velásquez Fernández, provider of the Instituto Venezolano de los Seguros Sociales (IVSS) and with whom he would have had a commercial rivalry.

Personal life 
He is son of Bertriz Ochoa de Giménez and the businessman Fenelón Giménez González.

References 

Football in Venezuela
Venezuelan businesspeople
1987 births
Living people